Michel-Nicolas Balisson, baron de Rougemont (27 February 1781 - 16 July 1840), was a French journalist, novelist and dramatist.

Biography 
His family comes from Sourdeval, in Normandy. He invented the mot de Cambronne.

Theatre 
Rougemont has authored numerous plays, alone or in collaboration. the most importants are : 
Chantons et facéties ; 
L’lngénue de Brive-la-Gaillarde ; 
Mademoiselle Musard ;
 1803 : L’Amour à l’anglaise ; 
 1806 : Le Mari supposé ;
 1808 : Monsieur et Madame Denis ; 
 1810 : Sophie, ou la Nouvelle Cendrillon ;
 1811 : La Femme innocente, malheureuse et persécutée ; 
 1811 : La Rosière de Verneuil ;  
 1812 : La Matrimonio-manie ; 
 1821 : Le Rôdeur français ; 
 1820 : Le Mariage du ci-devant jeune homme ; 
 1821 : Les Ermites comédie-vaudeville in 1 act by Edmond Crosnier, Aimé Desprez and Michel-Nicolas Balisson de Rougemont, théâtre de la Porte-Saint-Martin
 1826 : Pamela, ou la Fille du portier ; 
 1827 : La Laitière de Montfermeil ; 
 1829 : Le Voile bleu.
 1831 : La Fille unique ;
 1832 : Jeanne Vaubernier, ou la Cour de Louis XV ; 
 1834 : Salvoisy, ou l’Amoureux de la reine ; 
 1835 : Madelon Friquet ;  
 1835 : La Croix d'or by Charles Dupeuty and Michel-Nicolas Balisson de Rougemont, Théâtre du Palais Royal
 1836 : Léon, drama in 5 acts, théâtre de la Porte-Saint-Martin, 1 December
 1837 : Les Amants valets ; 
 1838 : La Reine des blanchisseuses ; 
 1839 : La Belle Bourbonnaise ;

Sources 
 Antoine Alexandre Barbier, Joseph Marie Quérard, Dictionnaire des ouvrages anonymes, Paris, Féchoz et Letouzey, 1882, (p. 438).

References 

19th-century French dramatists and playwrights
19th-century French journalists
French male journalists
People from La Rochelle
1781 births
1840 deaths
19th-century French male writers